John Roxborough Norman (1898, Wandsworth, London – 26 May 1944, Berkhamsted, Hertfordshire) was an English ichthyologist.

He started as a clerk in a bank. His lifetime affliction with rheumatic fever began during his military service during the First World War. He entered the British Museum in 1921 where he worked for Charles Tate Regan (1878-1943). From 1939 to 1944, he was in charge of the Natural History Museum at Tring as the Curator of Zoology. Norman was the author of, among others, A History of Fishes (1931) and A Draft Synopsis of the Orders, Families and Genera of Recent Fishes (1957). He was considered closer to Albert Günther (1830-1914) than to Regan.

See also
:Category:Taxa named by John Roxborough Norman

References

Aldemaro Romero Home Page (Archived on 14 September 2006)
Translated from the French Wikipedia article

1898 births
1944 deaths
English ichthyologists
People from Wandsworth
20th-century British zoologists
British military personnel of World War I